Scaramouche or Scaramouch (from Italian Scaramuccia , literally "little skirmisher") is a stock clown character of the 16th-century commedia dell'arte (comic theatrical arts of Italian literature). Usually attired in black Spanish dress and burlesquing a don, he was often beaten by Harlequin for his boasting and cowardice.

History
Although Tiberio Fiorillo (1608–1694) was not the first to play the role, he greatly developed and popularized it. He removed the mask, used white powder on his face, and employed grimaces. He was small, had a long beard, and wore a predominantly black costume with a white ruff. In France, he became known as Scaramouche.

In the 19th century, the English actor Joseph Grimaldi and his son J. S. Grimaldi made numerous appearances as Scaramouche.

Character
Scaramouche influences the audience to do his bidding. Rosa says that Coviello (like Scaramouche) is "short, adroit, supple, and conceited". In Molière's The Bourgeois Gentleman, Coviello disguises his master as a Turk and pretends to speak Turkish. Both Scaramouche and Coviello can be clever or stupid—as the actor sees fit to portray him.

In Blaise Pascal's Pensées Section 1 Article 12, Scaramouche is described as a person "who only thinks of one thing. The doctor, who speaks for a quarter of an hour after he has said everything, so full is he of the desire of talking."

In puppetry
Scaramouche is one of the great characters in the Punch and Judy puppet shows (a performative art with roots in commedia dell'arte). In some scenarios, he is the owner of The Dog, another stock character. During performances, Punch frequently strikes Scaramouche, causing his head to come off his shoulders. Because of this, the term scaramouche has become associated with a class of puppets with extendable necks.

Scaramouche in popular culture

 The hero of Rafael Sabatini's historical novel Scaramouche, and its film adaptations, is a similar swashbuckling character who goes incognito in the theatrical role of Scaramouche.
 Several films were named Scaramouche, among other past films and TV series, include:
 Scaramouche (1912-13) Op. 71, is a two-act tragic ballet-pantomime, comprising 21 numbers, written by the Finnish composer Jean Sibelius.
 Scaramouche (1923), silent movie by Rex Ingram
 Scaramouche (1952), directed by George Sidney with Stewart Granger, Janet Leigh, Eleanor Parker, and Mel Ferrer.
 The Adventures of Scaramouche (1963), a French-Italian-Spanish feature film, directed by Antonio Isasi-Isasmendi, starring Gérard Barray, Michèle Girardon, and Gianna Maria Canale.
 The Loves and Times of Scaramouche (1976), an Italian comedy film, directed by Enzo G. Castellari, starring Michael Sarrazin, Ursula Andress, and Aldo Maccione, about the adventures of a cad in Napoleonic times.
 Scaramouche is the name of a suite by the French composer Darius Milhaud for two pianos and some other combinations. Milhaud first composed the piece as an amalgam of music he wrote for theatre.
 In the 1975 song "Bohemian Rhapsody", by the British rock band Queen, Scaramouche is asked if he would like to perform the dance known as a fandango.
 Inspired by "Bohemian Rhapsody", Scaramouche is the name of the lead female role in the jukebox musical play We Will Rock You.
 Scaramouche Jones (2002) is a solo play by Justin Butcher, which was premiered in its full form by Pete Postlethwaite. In this 100-minute monologue, an aging clown recounts, at the turn of the millennium, the picaresque story of his life, from his early childhood in Trinidad at the start of the 20th century, the son of a gypsy prostitute and an Englishman, through his harsh misadventures in the slave trade and in wartime Poland, where as a gravedigger he found his vocation as a clown while striving to keep children amused by parodying their imminent slaughter.  
 In the opening chapter of the book Phule's Company by Robert Asprin, the main character Willard Phule uses Scaramouche as his alias. ("Scaramouche?" Major Joshua said with a frown. "Aside from the obvious reference to the character from the novel".)
 In Tom Stoppard's On the Razzle, Scaramouche is the nom de plume used by sales clerk Weinberl in his letters while answering "lonely hearts advertisements".
 Investor Anthony Scaramucci was named the White House communications director in July 2017 and removed later that same month. His very public presence in news media prompted an 8.185% increase in searches for Scaramouche, according to Merriam-Webster. Cartoonist Ruben Bolling hinted at some striking congruities between Scaramucci's conduct in office and the defining traits of the theatrical figure.
 Scaramouche is the name of a comedic villain henchman in season 5 of the American animated television series Samurai Jack, voiced by Tom Kenny.
 Scaramouche is the name of the 6th Fatui Harbinger in the video game Genshin Impact. His secondary title is "The Balladeer" and his real name is Kunikuzushi.

Notes

Bibliography

External links
 

Fictional characters introduced in the 16th century
Stock characters
Clever Zanni class characters
Italian fiction
Fictional Italian people
Male characters in literature